David Jobin (born September 27, 1981) is a Swiss professional ice hockey player who played for the SC Bern in Switzerland's National League A (NLA).

Career statistics

Awards and honours

References

External links

1981 births
SC Bern players
EHC Biel players
Living people
Swiss ice hockey defencemen
Ice hockey people from Bern